Mutinda is a Kenyan surname. Notable people with the surname include:

Daniel Musyoka Mutinda, member of the National Assembly of Kenya
David Mutinda Mutua (born 1992), Kenyan middle-distance runner
Julius Mutinda (born 1956), Kenyan field hockey player 

Surnames of Kenyan origin